Alys is a feminine given name. Notable people with the name include:

 Alys, Countess of the Vexin (c. 1160–1220), French princess
 Alys Clare (born 1944), English historical novelist
 Alys Faiz (1914–2003), Pakistani poet, writer, journalist, human rights activist, social worker and teacher
 Alys ferch Owain Glyndŵr (15th century), daughter of Margaret Hanmer and Owain Glyndŵr
 Alys Fowler (born 1978), a television presenter
 Alys Pearsall Smith (1867–1951), American Quaker
 Alys Robi (1923–2011), Canadian singer
 Alys Tomlinson (born 1975), British photographer
 ALYS, a French virtual singer developed by VoxWave on Alter/Ego

Other uses
 Alys (TV series), a television drama series on S4C

Feminine given names
Welsh feminine given names